Qaushiq Mukherjee (born 1975), popularly known as Q, is an Indian film director known for his controversial cult film Gandu. Mukherjee grew up in Kolkata and was educated at South Point High School. He completed his bachelor's degree from University of Calcutta. He worked in advertising for many years in India, Maldives and Sri Lanka. He is the founder and CEO of the indie film production company, Oddjoint Art Pvt. Ltd. His rapper persona Doktor Gandu has released several hit tracks as part of two albums. Though he is fond of classics like Ritwick Ghatak but despises Satyajit Ray.

Filmography
 2019: Taranath Tantrik (webseries)
 2018: Zero KMS (webseries)
 2018: Garbage
 2018: Nabarun (documentary on writer Nabarun Bhattacharya)
 Sari (documentary/ in production)
 2016: Brahman Naman
 2015:  Ludo
 2015: X: Past Is Present
 2012: Tasher Desh
 2010: Gandu
 2009: Love in India
 2009: Bishh
 2004: ''Le Pocha'

References

External links
 

Film directors from Kolkata
Bengali film directors
Living people
1975 births
21st-century Indian film directors
University of Calcutta alumni